Dr. Aziz Pahad (born 25 December 1940) is a South African politician, who served as Deputy Minister of Foreign Affairs from 1994 to 2008, he currently serves as an MP for Johannesburg West Highlands. He is the brother of Essop Pahad.

Education
Aziz Pahad matriculated at Central Indian High School, Johannesburg in 1959. He graduated in 1963 from the University of the Witwatersrand in Sociology and Afrikaans. He obtained a Diploma in International Relations from University College London in 1966 and an MA degree from the University of Sussex in 1968.

Anti-Apartheid activism
Under the apartheid regime in South Africa, Aziz Pahad was given a banning order in 1963, restricting his movement and preventing him from attending public meetings. In 1966, he left South Africa and lived mostly in London but also spent some time in Angola and Zimbabwe. He started working full-time for the ANC, developing the Anti-Apartheid Movement in the United Kingdom and Europe. In 1985, he was elected a National Executive Committee member of the ANC – a position he still holds.

Return to South Africa
In 1991, a year after he returned to South Africa from exile, he was appointed deputy head of the ANC Department of International Affairs. For the next three years, Aziz Pahad served as a member of the National Peace Executive Committee and of the Transitional Executive Council's sub-committee on Foreign Affairs.

Politician
In 1994, he was elected a Member of Parliament and was appointed Deputy Minister of Foreign Affairs in the government of President Nelson Mandela. He was re-elected in the 1999 election.

Following the resignation of President Thabo Mbeki in September 2008, Pahad was among those members of the Cabinet who submitted their resignations on 23 September, although it was subsequently announced that he might be willing to remain in his post.

Influence
Since his appointment as Deputy Minister of Foreign Affairs, Pahad has played a key role in shaping the ANC government's policies. His was a prominent role in South Africa's attempt to stop the US-led attack on Iraq in 2003. He represented his country in 2004 at the International Court of Justice when South Africa argued strongly against Israel's erection of a security fence. He told the court:

"The Palestinian separation wall is not a security wall. It is a wall of occupation, a wall that has separated hundreds of thousands of Palestinians from their families, their homes, lands and religious sites."

In Africa, Pahad played an active role in bringing peace to the warring factions of the Democratic Republic of Congo, Burundi and Angola. He visited Saudi Arabia in March 2006 to promote bilateral political and economic relations between the two countries.

Nuclear controversy
On 20 April 1997 Aziz Pahad was quoted in the Israeli daily newspaper Ha'aretz as confirming that the 1979 flash over the Indian Ocean (Vela incident) was indeed from a South African nuclear test. Soon afterwards, Pahad reported that he had been misquoted by Ha'aretz and that he was merely repeating rumours that had been circulating for years.

References

External links
Profile of Aziz Pahad
Experienced foreign affairs spokesman
Aziz Pahad to visit Saudi Arabia

Government ministers of South Africa
Anti-apartheid activists
1940 births
Living people
University of the Witwatersrand alumni
Alumni of University College London
Alumni of the University of Sussex
Members of the National Assembly of South Africa
African National Congress politicians
South African people of Indian descent
South African Muslims